Medgyesi is a Hungarian surname, where Medgyes is a  Hungarian name of Mediaș. Notable people with the surname include:

 Fruzsina Medgyesi (born 1999), Hungarian figure skater
 Judit Medgyesi (born 1956), Hungarian basketball player

See also
 Medgyes (surname)
 Péter Medgyessy

Hungarian-language surnames